The Cuieșd is a right tributary of the river Mureș in Transylvania, Romania. It discharges into the Mureș in Cristești. Its name originates from the Hungarian “kő” for “stone”, so its name means “Stony Creek”.

References

Rivers of Romania
Rivers of Mureș County